Stuart Victor Martin (June 11, 1938 – June 12, 1980) was an American jazz drummer.

Career
Martin was a professional musician by the age of sixteen when he played drums for the big bands of Count Basie,  Jimmy Dorsey, Les and Larry Elgart, Duke Ellington, Maynard Ferguson, Quincy Jones, and Billy May. In the 1960s he worked with Gary Burton, Donald Byrd, Curtis Fuller, Herbie Hancock, Oliver Nelson, Sonny Rollins, Steve Swallow, and Lambert, Hendricks, and Ross. He was a member of a band in West Germany that consisted of Lee Konitz, Albert Mangelsdorff, and Attila Zoller and in a band with Rolf Kuhn and Joachim Kuhn. Martin was a member of The Trio with Barre Phillips and John Surman, then as a member with Charlie Mariano. In the 1970s he recorded with Carla Bley, Slide Hampton, and John McLaughlin.

In 1975, the Trio went to Paris to do a collaborative project with the Paris Opera orchestra and the Carolyn Carlson Dance Company. After this project, he continued to play with the Trio and also toured with the rock band New York Gong.

Martin died at the age of 42 in Paris as the result of a drug reaction.

Discography

As leader
 Alors with Barre Phillips, Michel Portal, John Surman (Futura, 1970)
 Where Fortune Smiles with John McLaughlin (Dawn, 1971)
 Conflagration, The Trio with Phillips and Surman (1971)
 Live at Woodstock Town Hall with John Surman (Dawn, 1975)
 Mountainscapes with Barre Phillips (ECM, 1976)
 Sunrise (EPM, 1996)

As sideman
With Curtis Fuller
 Boss of the Soul-Stream Trombone (Warwick, 1960)
 The Magnificent Trombone of Curtis Fuller (Epic, 1961)

With Quincy Jones
 I Dig Dancers (Mercury, 1961)
 Newport '61 (Mercury, 1961)
 The Great Wide World of Quincy Jones: Live! (1961)
 The Quintessence (Impulse!, 1962)
Quincy Plays for Pussycats (Mercury, 1959-65 [1965])

With Sonny Rollins
  All the Things You Are  (1964)
 The Standard Sonny Rollins (RCA Victor, 1964)

With Tomasz Stańko, Tomasz Szukalski
 Double Concerto for Five Soloists and Orchestra (Poljazz, 1972)

With Tomasz Stańko, Janusz Stefański
 Fish Face (Poljazz, 1974)

With others
 1960 Newport Suite, Maynard Ferguson (Roulette)
 1960 The Hottest New Group in Jazz, Lambert, Hendricks & Ross (Columbia)
 1961 Fast Livin' Blues, Jon Hendricks
 1966 New Advanced Jazz, Valdo Williams (Savoy)
 1969 Smashing Thirds, Joe Turner (MPS)
 1969 Zo-Ko-Ma, Lee Konitz
 1971 Tales of the Algonquin, John Surman/John Warren
 1971 Ossiach Live John McLaughlin (BASF)
 1975 13, Carla Bley/Michael Mantler 
 1978 Cloud Line Blue, Karin Krog (P-Vine)

References

American jazz drummers
1938 births
1980 deaths
20th-century American drummers
American male drummers
20th-century American male musicians
American male jazz musicians